Omaka Classic Cars displays a collection of more than one hundred cars all built in the second half of the 20th century. The collection's building is next to the building of the Omaka Aviation Heritage Centre in Omaka, Blenheim, New Zealand. The cars have been gathered by one of the trustees of Marlborough Motoring Trust which runs the collection.

References

External links
 

Automobile museums in New Zealand
Blenheim, New Zealand
Buildings and structures in Blenheim, New Zealand
Museums in the Marlborough Region
2010s architecture in New Zealand